Medal events in both men's (4) and women's (2) bodybuilding were included in the 1989 World Games. The 1989 Games were the third World Games, an international quadrennial multi-sport event, and were held in Karlsruhe, West Germany. Point scoring was typically based on mandatory posing (front, back and side poses) and optional posing determined by the athlete. Bodybuilders from eleven nations won medals.

Medalists

References

1989
1989 World Games
1989 in bodybuilding